The bacterial colony optimization algorithm is an optimization algorithm which is based on a lifecycle model that simulates some typical behaviors of E. coli bacteria during their whole lifecycle, including chemotaxis, communication, elimination, reproduction, and migration.

References

Optimization algorithms and methods
Escherichia coli